Nukala Viswanadham (born 9 November 1943 in India), an Indian Academic, is currently INSA Senior Scientist at the Department of Computer Science and Automation, Indian Institute of Science. He is a Fellow of Third World Academy of Sciences. He is an elected Fellow of Indian National Science Academy, Indian Academy of Sciences, Indian National Academy of Engineering, and IEEE. He was a recipient of S.K. Mitra Memorial Award of INAE. He worked at Indian Institute of Science as a Professor, National University of Singapore, and Indian School of Business.

Education
Bachelor of Engineering, Indian Institute of Science
Master in Engineering, Indian Institute of Science
PhD, Indian Institute of Science

Professional
Viswanadham is the Chief Editor of Sadhana, Academy Proceedings in Engineering Sciences. He was the Editor-in-Chief of IEEE Transactions on Automation Science and Engineering during 2008-2012.

Awards, honors, and fellowships
Fellow IEEE
Fellow of The Third World Academy of Sciences, Italy
Fellow of Indian National Science Academy
Fellow of Indian Academy of Sciences
Fellow of Indian National Academy of Engineering
S.K.Mitra Memorial Award of Indian National Academy of Engineering

Books
N.Viswanadham, V.V.S. Sarma and M.G. Singh, "Reliability of Computer and Control Systems", North-Holland Systems and Control series, Amsterdam, Vol.8, 446 pages, 1987.
N. Viswanadham and Y. Narahari, "Performance Modelling of Automated Manufacturing Systems", Prentice Hall, USA, 592 pages, 1992.
N. Viswanadham, "Analysis of Manufacturing Enterprises: An approach to leverage the value delivery processes to competitive advantage", Kluwer Academic Publishers, 312 pages, 1999.
N. Viswanadham and S. Kameshwaran, "Ecosystem Aware Global Supply Chain Management", World Scientific Publishing, 2013.
N. Viswanadham,"Recent Advances in Modelling and Control of Stochastic Systems", Indian Academy of Sciences, 1991, p. 169.

Selected publications

References

External links
Lcm.csa.iisc.ernet.in

1943 births
Living people
Andhra University alumni
Fellows of the Indian Academy of Sciences
Fellows of the Indian National Science Academy
Indian computer scientists
Academic staff of the Indian Institute of Science